Yvonne Vermaak won in the final 6–3, 7–5 against Carling Bassett.

Seeds
A champion seed is indicated in bold text while text in italics indicates the round in which that seed was eliminated. The top four seeds received a bye to the second round.

  Hana Mandlíková (quarterfinals)
  Sylvia Hanika (quarterfinals)
  Mima Jaušovec (second round)
  Kathy Rinaldi (quarterfinals)
  Kathy Jordan (semifinals)
  Yvonne Vermaak (champion)
  Sue Barker (first round)
  Carling Bassett (final)

Draw

Final

Section 1

Section 2

External links
 1983 WTA Congoleum Classic Draw

Singles